Mélo may refer to:
 Mélo (play), a 1929 play by Henri Bernstein
 Mélo (film), a 1986 French romantic drama film, based on the play
 Mélo, a 2022 album by French rapper and singer Tiakola

See also
 Melo (disambiguation)